Aenictus fergusoni is a species of reddish brown army ant found in Bangladesh, India, Myanmar, Nicobar Islands, Thailand, Vietnam, and China.

References

External links

 at antwiki.org

Dorylinae
Hymenoptera of Asia
Insects described in 1901